Todd Jones Jr., also known as T-Nutty, aka The Flowmastermouth or The Last of the Flo Heakinz, is an American rapper from Sacramento, California . He has appeared on albums such as Tech N9ne's Misery Loves Kompany and K.O.D..

Discography

Studio albums

 2002 The Gasoline (Bootleg: fan made)
 2003 Last of the Floheakinz
 2004 Flowmastermouth: West Walkin'''
 2005 The Nutt Factor Project 2008 Raw From Da Jaw Chapter 3 2010 Perfect Attendance (Best of) 2011 The Tonite Show Channel 24St (with DJ Fresh) 2013 Sac It Up and Serve It Gas Chamber 2.4 2016 Blue Venom 2018 Return of the Floheakinwith Big RoccState 2 State (2006)

with Big NoLove 69ECLyrical Octane (2005)

with Black Armor RecordsThe Best Kept Secretz Vol.1 (2002)

with DJ Mighty MikeBar 4 Bar - The Street Album (2010)

with LiqSlangin' and Bangin' (2012)Slangin' and Bangin' Pt. 2 (2017)

with Messy MarvTha 2nd & 3rd Letter (2009)

with Mr. Skrillz, Doey Rock & Hollow TipSactown's Most Wanted'' (2011)

with San Quinn
'  A Warrior And A King: Lyrical Kingdom (2007)

References

External links
Official T-Nutty Twitter
Official T-Nutty Facebook
Official T-Nutty Instagram

African-American male rappers
Living people
Rappers from Sacramento, California
Year of birth missing (living people)
Gangsta rappers
Crips
21st-century American rappers
21st-century American male musicians
21st-century African-American musicians